"Bitter Tears" is a song by Australian rock band INXS, released as the third Australian and fourth UK single from their seventh studio album, X (1990). The song was written by Andrew Farriss and Michael Hutchence as part of the sessions for the X album. It peaked at number 30 on the UK Singles Chart and number 36 in Australia. The single was released to coincide with the band headlining the SummerXS concert at Wembley Stadium in July 1991, as documented in the Live Baby Live DVD.

B-sides
The B-sides are a live version of "Faith In Each Other" from the X album, "The Other Side", written and performed by guitarist & saxophonist Kirk Pengilly and "Soothe Me" written and performed by guitarist & keyboard player Andrew Farriss.

Track listings
UK 7-inch single
 "Bitter Tears" (LP version)
 "Soothe Me"
 "Bitter Tears" (Lorimer 7-inch edit)

UK 12-inch single
 "Bitter Tears" (12-inch Lorimer remix)
 "Disappear" (Morales remix)
 "Tears Are Bitter" (instrumental club mix)

UK 12-inch special edition (Wembley Stadium cover)
 "Bitter Tears" (Lorimer 12-inch mix)
 "Disappear" (Morales 12-inch mix)
 "Soothe Me"

UK CD single
 "Bitter Tears"
 "Soothe Me"
 "Original Sin"
 "Listen Like Thieves" (extended remix)

US maxi-CD single
 "Bitter Tears" (LP version)
 "Bitter Tears" (12-inch Lorimer remix)
 "Bitter Tears" (instrumental)
 "Disappear" (Morales remix)
 "The Other Side"

Charts

Weekly charts

Year-end charts

Release history

References

INXS songs
1990 songs
1991 singles
Atlantic Records singles
Mercury Records singles
Song recordings produced by Chris Thomas (record producer)
Songs written by Andrew Farriss
Songs written by Michael Hutchence
Warner Music Group singles